Graeme Hossack (born July 22, 1992) is a Canadian professional lacrosse player who plays as a defenseman for the Halifax Thunderbirds of the National Lacrosse League (NLL) and Archers Lacrosse Club of the Premier Lacrosse League (PLL). In 2020, Hossack became the second player to be named the NLL Defensive Player of the Year for three consecutive years after Kyle Rubisch won four straight from 2012–15.

College and junior career 
Hossack played for the Whitby Warriors of the Ontario Junior Lacrosse League, where he won the Minto Cup in 2011 and 2013.

Hossack attended Lindenwood University where he played four seasons of Division II lacrosse as an LSM. He was a three-time First Team all-ECAC player, two-time ECAC Specialist of the Year, and as a senior, he became Lindenwood's first ever First Team All-American. He majored in environmental biology.

Professional career

NLL 
Hossack was selected second overall in the 2015 NLL Draft by the Rochester Knighthawks. He made his professional debut on January 9, 2016, where he scored twice. He finished the season second among rookies with 91 loose balls and was named to the All-Rookie team. In his second season, Hossack was a finalist for the NLL Defensive Player of the Year Award and was named All-League Second Team. He then won the Defensive Player of the Year and first team All-League for the first time the following two seasons. Ahead of the 2020 season, the Knighthawks moved to Halifax, being rebranded as the Halifax Thunderbirds. Hossack continued his dominance, once again winning the Defensive Player of the Year Award and being named First Team All-League. In September 2021, The Thunderbirds re-signed Hossack to a five-year contract.

Heading into the 2023 NLL season, Inside Lacrosse named Hossack the #5 best defender in the NLL.

MLL 
Hossack played 3 seasons in Major League Lacrosse for the Atlanta Blaze.

PLL 
Hossack decided to enter the Premier Lacrosse League Entry Draft in 2021, having not played professional field lacrosse since 2018. He was selected second overall by Archers Lacrosse Club. As a close defenseman, Hossack was named an All-Star, and at the end of the season, was named the Dave Pietramala Defensive Player of the Year.

International career 
Hossack has represented Canada in the 2018 World Lacrosse Championship and the 2019 World Indoor Lacrosse Championship, being named to the All-World Team both times.

Career statistics

College

NLL

MLL

PLL

References

External links 
 Graeme Hossack professional lacrosse stats via statscrew.com
 Premier Lacrosse League bio and stats

Living people
1992 births
Atlanta Blaze players
Canadian lacrosse players
Halifax Thunderbirds players
Rochester Knighthawks players
Sportspeople from Ontario
People from Scugog